Comamonas phosphati is a Gram-negative, rod-shaped, facultatively anaerobic and non-spore-forming bacterium from the genus Comamonas which has been isolated from a phosphate mine in Yunnan in China.

References

External links
Type strain of Comamonas phosphati at BacDive -  the Bacterial Diversity Metadatabase

Comamonadaceae
Bacteria described in 2016